FTO may refer to:

 Field training officer
 Fluorine-doped tin oxide (SnO2:F)
 Foreign Terrorist Organisation, term used in the U.S. State Department list of Foreign Terrorist Organizations
 Freedom to operate
 Frontier Oil, a defunct American oil company that traded on the NYSE as FTO
 FTO, initialism used for the New South Wales Film and Television Office, former name of Screen NSW
 FTO gene, a fat mass and obesity-associated protein 
 Mitsubishi FTO, an automobile